Babylon 5: The Legend of the Rangers (subtitled: To Live and Die in Starlight) is the fifth telefilm set in the Babylon 5 universe (not including the pilot, The Gathering).

Originally airing January 19, 2002 on the Sci Fi Channel (now Syfy), it was written by J. Michael Straczynski and directed by Mike Vejar. Though shot as a pilot for a possible new series, it aired opposite NFL playoffs and the subsequent poor ratings led to it not being picked up.

Plot synopsis
As the Shadow War ended, hundreds of civilizations were devastated. It is up to the Interstellar Alliance, with the help of the Rangers, to rebuild what the great war had destroyed and to hold peace among the worlds of the ISA.

In the year 2265, David Martel (Dylan Neal), a Ranger, is given the command of a twenty-year-old Ranger starship, Liandra, and is asked to escort a Valen-class cruiser to a secret location carrying several diplomats, including Ambassador G'Kar (Andreas Katsulas). Upon arrival, the two craft are attacked on behalf of an unknown, mysterious, and ancient force known only as The Hand whose lethal power is far greater than any previously known to Earth or any other world in the Interstellar Alliance.

Cast
 Dylan Neal as David Martell
 Andreas Katsulas as G'Kar
 Alex Zahara as Dulann
 Myriam Sirois as Sarah Cantrell
 Dean Marshall as Malcolm Bridges
 Warren Takeuchi as Kitaro "Kit" Sasaki
 Jennie Rebecca Hogan as Na'Feel
 Mackenzie Gray as Kafta
 David Storch as Tafeek
 Enid-Raye Adams as Firell
 Gus Lynch as Tirk

External links
 Babylon 5: The Legend of the Rangers official site (Sci Fi Channel).  Archived from the original on April 8, 2002.
 
 
 

Legend of the Rangers, The
Syfy original films
2002 television films
2002 films
Films set in the 23rd century
Television films as pilots
American science fiction television films
2002 science fiction films
Films scored by Christopher Franke
Films directed by Michael Vejar
2000s American films